Ershad Yousefi (born September 19, 1981, in Mashhad, Iran) is an Iranian football goalkeeper who most recently plays for Foolad in Iran Pro League.

Club career

Club Career Statistics
Last Update 25 May 2015

International career
He was the goalkeeper of Iran national under-20 football team at the 2001 FIFA World Youth Championship held in Argentina. In 2002, he was the reserve goalkeeper for Iran national football team at the West Asian Football Federation Championship, but did not make an appearance. In 2005, he was goalkeeper for Iran Under-23 team that participated in the 2005 Islamic Solidarity Games in Saudi Arabia.

Honours
Foolad
Iran Pro League (1): 2013–14
Sepahan
Hazfi Cup (1}: 2003–04

References
Iran Pro League Stats

Iranian footballers
Persian Gulf Pro League players
F.C. Aboomoslem players
Sepahan S.C. footballers
Saipa F.C. players
Shirin Faraz Kermanshah players
Foolad FC players
Saba players
Sportspeople from Mashhad
1981 births
Living people
Asian Games gold medalists for Iran
Asian Games medalists in football
Footballers at the 2002 Asian Games
Medalists at the 2002 Asian Games
Association football goalkeepers
21st-century Iranian people